Paper Sun is a single by British band Def Leppard from their 9th album Euphoria. It charted at #11 on the US Mainstream Rock Charts. It failed to chart elsewhere, however. It is included on the second disc of the compilation album Rock of Ages: The Definitive Collection.

Overview
Lyrically, the song is about the Omagh bombing which occurred on August 15, 1998.
After being omitted from tour set lists since the Euphoria World Tour in 2000, the song returned to Def Leppard's set list for their 2015 World Tour with Tesla and Styx and was played during the 2019 Las Vegas Residency .

Charts

References

Def Leppard songs
1999 singles
Anti-war songs
Protest songs
Songs based on actual events
Songs written by Phil Collen
Songs written by Vivian Campbell
Songs written by Joe Elliott
Songs written by Rick Savage
1998 songs
Mercury Records singles
Songs about The Troubles (Northern Ireland)